Wheels of Steel is the second studio album by English heavy metal band Saxon. Released in 1980, it was their first album to enter the UK Albums Chart, peaking at number 5, and is their highest-charting album in the UK Albums Chart to date. The album eventually went on to achieve gold status in the UK.

Song notes
"747 (Strangers in the Night)" is about a power cut that forced planes in New York to remain in ascent in 1965 with the power outage provoking a Scandinavian flight to detour to Kennedy airport in the dark.

The title track is featured in the video games Grand Theft Auto: Episodes from Liberty City (Grand Theft Auto: The Lost and Damned and Grand Theft Auto: The Ballad of Gay Tony) and Brütal Legend. It has also been covered by L.A. Guns on their album Rips the Covers Off and bears a strong resemblance to the outro riff of "Rock 'n' Roll Doctor" by Black Sabbath, although according to guitarist Graham Oliver the song was actually inspired by the Ted Nugent song "Cat Scratch Fever".

Reception

The album received very positive reviews from critics and is today regarded as a classic, genre-defining metal album. Eduardo Rivadavia of AllMusic lists the album as "topping the heap of essential Saxon albums, pretty much hand in hand with its immediate successors, Strong Arm of the Law and Denim and Leather, effectively setting the template for the band's most successful efforts." Canadian reviewer Martin Popoff regards Wheels of Steel as a "qualified classic" and "one of really two or three of (NWOBHM's) building blocks;" it is "a record on a mission, willing to take responsibility as a spokesvinyl for legions of English punters with a thirst for regular metal guys". Sputnikmusic's Mike Stagno praises "the solid, consistent rhythms that produce the riffy, yet accessible tunes" and Biff Byford's "powerful singing", which make Wheels of Steel "perhaps not one of metal's best albums," but "still a very worthwhile album."

Track listing

2009 remaster bonus tracks 13-17 recorded Live at the Monsters of Rock Festival Castle Donington 16 August 1980
'See The Light Shining' dedicated to Fast Eddie.

Personnel
Saxon
Biff Byford – vocals
Graham Oliver – guitar
Paul Quinn – guitar
Steve Dawson – bass guitar
Pete Gill – drums

Production
Pete Hinton – producer
Will Reid Dick – engineer

Charts

Album

Singles

Certifications

References

Saxon (band) albums
1980 albums
Carrere Records albums